Malan Breton (born 16 June 1973) is a Taiwanese-born, fashion designer. He is known for his work as a film, and music video director, as a columnist, costume designer, popular musician, television, film producer, Goodwill Ambassador to Taiwan, Ambassador to UK Parliament / Parliamentary Society, and actor. In a 2019 British Vogue article, Breton was referred to as "Meet Malan Breton, The Most Influential Designer You've Never Heard Of" 

He launched his namesake fashion label "Malan Breton" in 2005, Malan Breton Homme in 2010, and Fantôme Malan Breton in 2012. On 27 March 2020, Malan Breton released his first music single, a cover of "Somethin' Stupid", featuring Japanese pop band Emergency Tiara. He is also known for his philanthropic work in the United Kingdom, and the United States.

Early life
Breton was born in Taipei, Taiwan. He began designing fashion at the age of eleven but grew up, as a performer, in the entertainment industry. He never went to design school and is self-taught as a designer.

Career
In 1996, Breton moved to New York to cast for the New York fashion week Spring 1997 Collection shows at 7th on Sixth. As a model, Breton was photographed by top photographers and directors Herb Ritts, Len Prince and Hype Williams. Thom Oliphant, Joseph Kahn, thus getting his start in fashion design as a stylist. His mentors in fashion include Arnold Scaasi, also noted is his training on Savile Row. In 2005, Breton was one of twelve new designers to watch for on the New York runway in WWD Women's Wear Dailies "Cheat Sheet". Malan Breton first received public notice when he came in 14th in the third season of Project Runway (2006).

Breton was featured on an episode of E! Television Fashion Emergency when he performed in the 1998 revival of Cabaret on Broadway. From 1999 to 2005, he was the promo voice of ESPN Extreme Sports and the promo voice for ABC Sports in 2033.

In 2007, he opened the first Malan Breton flagship store in NYC's East Village. The collection expanded in 2008 to include Malan Breton Accessories. and in 2010, expanded to include a full line of menswear - Malan Breton Homme (Men). In 2008, Breton and the collection was featured on an episode of Australia's Next Top Model  (Cycle 4, episode New York, New York). They featured on an episode of MTV News (episode 'Project Runway' Alumni Stand Out at New York Fashion Week). In 2009, he appeared on MTV Detox (Jim Cantiello With No Pants!). In 2011, Malan Breton Homme and Breton were featured on an episode of MTV News (It's A 'Party And Rock And Roll' Lifestyle For Jim). In 2010, Breton designed costumes for NBC's prime-time game show Minute to Win It, and again in 2011. In 2012, Malan Breton expanded to include Fantôme Malan Breton.

In 2014, Malan Breton expanded into outerwear with his first license In 2015, Breton starred with Celeste Holm in the comedy College Debts. In 2016, Malan Breton was named Ambassador to Taiwan to the office of Tourism. In 2017, Breton appeared on an episode of Good Day New York featured on FOX Television Stations, and partnered with Tokenly and Sohomuse to "launch the first blockchain-powered digital experience for the fashion industry".

In 2020, Breton held his first 3D online fashion show, featuring CGI-designed models. On 27 March 2020, Malan Breton with Emergency Tiara released a cover of the music single "Somethin' Stupid". In December 2020, Malan Breton duetted with seventh generation Vanderbilt heir Consuelo Costin, on a charity cover of the song "I'll Be Home for Christmas".

Directing
Breton was the subject/host/co-producer of The Malan Show featured on BravoTV.com as a weekly web series. It followed the process of making it in America as an independent designer.
 XVJC: Julius Caesar (2019)
 8 Counts a Dancer (Documentary) (2018)
 Kristine W "Stars" Music Video (2018) The video ranked number one on the Billboard charts.
 Malan Breton a Journey to Taiwan (Documentary) 2015. The film won the 2015 NYIFF Award for best documentary short.
 Immortal (animated short) In 2022 "Immortal" won the London Fashion Film Festival Award for best 2D/3D animation, it was also chosen by Cameramoda as an official selection for Fashion Film Festival Milan presented by Cinecittà.

Fashion columnist
Malan Breton contributed weekly to OK! magazine's column "Malan's Musings". He covered the 82nd Academy Awards for OK! magazine in a column called "Malan Breton Takes on Oscar Fashion!" He and Jeannie Mai covered red carpet fashion for the 2012 Golden Globes Awards for OK! magazine.

Costume design
Malan Breton has designed specialty costumes for NBC's New Year's Eve (2020), Golden Globe Awards (2019), WWE SmackDown (2019), 73rd Tony Awards (2019), The Real Housewives of Beverly Hills (2019), Quantico (2018), The Voice UK (2018), 2018 Laurence Olivier Awards (2018), The Real Housewives of Beverly Hills (2018), Dick Clark's New Year's Rockin' Eve (2018) Specialty Costumes for the country music band Florida Georgia Line, Kristine W Stars (2018), RuPaul's Drag Race (2017), America's Next Top Model (2017), American Music Awards (2017), BET Awards Specialty costumes for Ray J (2017), Gay for Play Game Show Starring RuPaul (2017), The Real Housewives of New York City (2016), Vanderpump Rules (2017), America's Best Dance Crew MTV (2016), Style Code Live (2016), The Real Housewives of New York City (2011), Minute to Win It (2010 - 2011), Australia's Next Top Model (2008), A-List Awards Bravo (2008).

Awards

 2022: UK S.A.L. "British Fashion Designer of the Year" Award
 2022: Fashion Film Festival Milan - "Cameramoda" National Chamber of Italian Fashion Cinecitta Jury Selection, "Best Animated Short Film", "Immortal" 
 2021: London Fashion Film Festival Jury Selection for “best 2D 3D Animation” for the, Spring Summer 2021, AI VR fashion film “Immortal” with DNABLOCK Ai 
 2021: UK Parliament/Parliamentary Society AFS Award for charitable efforts for children during the pandemic 
 2021: Carmarthen Bay Film Festival, UK “Best Animated Short” [Nominee] “Immortal” with DNABLOCK Ai

 2019: UK “Ambassador of the Arts” for his work in fashion, for UK Parliament and the Parliamentary Society for Arts, Sports, and Fashion, by Director Rebeca Riofrio, presided over by Zac Goldsmith PC.
January 2016 CNA News Taiwan noted Breton, as ambassador to Taiwan for Tourism.
2016 Taiwan Tourism Award
 2016 Fashion Group International "Rising Star" (Menswear), 
 2015 Taiwan Tourism Award, 
 NYIFF Best Documentary Short, Director "Malan Breton A Journey to Taiwan"; 
 2014 United Colours of Fashion "Fashion Icon",  
 2014 European Fashion Council, Bulgarian Fashion Awards, "Eirene"; 
 Nominated for the WGSN Global Fashion Award "Outstanding Collaboration, Malan Breton and NBC".

Collaborations
 Taiwan Breton designed the official government work uniforms, and stationary.
 Rado (watchmaker)
 Smithsonian American Art Museum
 Princeton University Breton Lectured on "Optimizing Your Personal Style"
 Lalique
 Marilyn Monroe Estate, and Jewelry Television
 EVA Air (On the 2015 film "Malan Breton- A Journey to Taiwan")
 China Airlines (On the 2015 film "Malan Breton- A Journey to Taiwan")
 WGSN (trend forecasting)
 Swarovski
 OK!
 Bravo (U.S. TV network)
 MTV
 Reprise Records
 Brother Industries
 Nintendo
 Fancy Feast
 Cosmetic Executive Women
 Zoya
 Joico
 Toni & Guy
 J Renee
 Church & Dwight
 Giorgio Brutini
 Michela Rigucci

See also
 Chinese people in New York City
 LGBT culture in New York City
 New Yorkers in journalism
 Taiwanese people in New York City

References

External links
 Official site
 

1973 births
Living people
20th-century American male actors
21st-century American male actors
21st-century Taiwanese male actors
Ambassadors of the United States
American columnists
American costume designers
American fashion businesspeople
American fashion designers of Chinese descent
American fashion designers
American jewellers
American male film actors
American male models
American male stage actors
American male television actors
American tailors
Artists from Taipei
Bags (fashion)
British fashion designers
Clothing brands of the United Kingdom
Clothing companies based in London
Clothing companies established in 2005
Companies based in New York City
Creative directors
Design companies established in 2005
Fashion accessory brands
Film directors from New York City
Film directors from Taipei
High fashion brands
Journalists from New York City
Juilliard School alumni
LGBT fashion designers
Luxury brands
Male actors from New York City
Male actors from Taipei
Menswear designers
Project Runway (American series)
Taiwanese emigrants to the United States
Taiwanese fashion designers
Taiwanese male television actors
Television producers from New York City
Underwear brands